Gian Simmen (born 19 February 1977) is a Swiss snowboarder. In Snowboarding at the 1998 Winter Olympics, Simmen won Gold in Men's Halfpipe. He competed at the 1998, 2002, and the 2006 Olympics Winter games.

References

External links
 FIS-Ski.com - FIS Competition Results

Swiss male snowboarders
Olympic snowboarders of Switzerland
Olympic gold medalists for Switzerland
Snowboarders at the 1998 Winter Olympics
Snowboarders at the 2002 Winter Olympics
Snowboarders at the 2006 Winter Olympics
1977 births
Living people
Olympic medalists in snowboarding
Medalists at the 1998 Winter Olympics